= Hans Ernst Otto Christian von Rohr =

Hans Ernst Otto Christian von Rohr (1726–1778) was a Prussian officer during the Seven Years' War.

== Biography ==
Rohr was born in Mecklenburg in 1726. He joined the Prussian army in 1744. He was an ensign in 1750 and by 1771, had been promoted to major. In 1771, he was placed in command of the Carlowitz Infantry Battalion and distinguished himself in the Seven Years' War.
